Ashland, California
 Balch Springs, Texas
 Barstow, California
 Boyes Hot Springs, California
 Buena Park, California
 Cabazon, California
 Calistoga, California
 Carpinteria, California
 Carson, California
 Charter Oak, California
 Colma, California
 Corona, California
 Cressey, California
 Dalton, Georgia
 Del Aire, California
 Eastvale, California
 Escondido, California
 Fruitridge Pocket, California
 Gardena, California
 Gerber, California
 Green Acres, California
 Hacienda Heights, California
 Hackensack, New Jersey
 Harbor City, Los Angeles
 Hartranft, Philadelphia
 Hayward, California
 Hendry County, Florida
 Hesperia, California
 Highland, California
 Imperial Beach, California
 La Presa, California
 Lake Elsinore, California
 Lake Placid, Florida
 Lathrop, California
 Lemon Hill, California
 Lenwood, California
 Live Oak, Sutter County, California
 Long Beach, California
 Los Angeles
 Merced, California
 Mid-City, Los Angeles
 Newark, California
 North Long Beach, Long Beach, California
 Oceano, California
 Pacoima, Los Angeles
 Parkway, California
 Pittsburg, California
 Reservoir, Providence, Rhode Island
 Richmond, California
 Riverside, California
 Salida, California
 San Jose, California
 San Juan Bautista, California
 San Lorenzo, California
 Seaside, California
 Silver Lake, Providence, Rhode Island
 Stockton, California
 Tara Hills, California
 Tustin, California
 Valley, Providence, Rhode Island
 Victorville, California
 Visalia, California
 Vista, California
 Warm Springs, California
 West Long Beach
 Winchester, California
 Winnetka, Los Angeles
 Woodland, California

Hispanic plurality populations
Ethnic enclaves in the United States